University Club is a historic club building located at Rochester in Monroe County, New York. It was constructed in 1930 and is a four-story, rectangular brick structure with a seven bay Georgian Revival style facade.

It was listed on the National Register of Historic Places in 1985.

References

Buildings and structures in Rochester, New York
Clubhouses on the National Register of Historic Places in New York (state)
Georgian Revival architecture in New York (state)
Buildings and structures completed in 1930
National Register of Historic Places in Rochester, New York